Trapezites genevieveae, the ornate ochre skipper, is a butterfly of the family Hesperiidae. It is found in Australia along the coast of New South Wales and Queensland.

The larvae feed on Lomandra spicata.

External links
 CSIRO Entomology
 Australian Faunal Directory

Trapezitinae
Butterflies described in 1997